HMS H10 was a British H-class submarine built by the Canadian Vickers Co., Montreal. She was laid down on an unknown date and was commissioned in June 1915.

HMS H10 was lost in the North Sea on 19 January 1918.

Design

H10 was fitted with a  Hotchkiss quick-firing gun (6-pounder) and four  torpedo tubes. Its torpedo tubes were fitted to the bows and the submarine was loaded with eight  torpedoes. It is a Holland 602 type submarine but was designed to meet Royal Navy specifications. Its complement was twenty-two crew members.

References

Bibliography

External links
 'Submarine losses 1904 to present day' - Royal Navy Submarine Museum

 

British H-class submarines
Ships built in Quincy, Massachusetts
1915 ships
World War I submarines of the United Kingdom
World War I shipwrecks in the North Sea
Royal Navy ship names
Maritime incidents in 1918